Pardesi (English: Foreigner) is a 1993 Bollywood drama film directed by Raj N. Sippy. It stars Mithun Chakraborty, Sumalata, Varsha Usgaonkar and Iqbal Durrani, with Pankaj Dheer, Shakti Kapoor, Suresh Oberoi in supporting roles.The screenplay is by Iqbal Durrani.

Cast
Biswajeet as Ajay 
Mumtaz as Maina 
Kanan Kaushal as Savitri
Padma Khanna as Lajjo
Sujit Kumar as Vijay 
Jeevan as Munim Dharampal
Manmohan as Tikora
Manmohan Krishna as Ustad
Sulochana Latkar as Ajay & Vijay's Mother
Jayshree T. as Cabaret Dancer

Soundtrack
The film's music was composed by Chitragupta, with song lyrics by Majrooh Sultanpuri.

External links
 

1970 films
1970s Hindi-language films
1970 drama films
Films scored by Chitragupta